Ivan Semenovich Senin (December 13, 1903 - 1981) was the First Deputy Chairman of the Council of Ministers of the USSR, a member of the Central Committee of the Communist Party of the Soviet Union, and a Member of the Presidium of the Communist Party of Ukraine.

Biography

Ivan Senin was born in 1903, into a miner's family in Donbas. In 1917 he graduated from school in Petrovsky, and started working at the mine No. 19 at Rutchenkovo, where for four years he was a lamp carrier, and horse driver. In 1921, he was elected the secretary of Rutchenkovo Komsomol committee. In autumn 1922, Senin began studying at Donetsk technical school named after Artem. After the workers' school Ivan Senin graduated from Polytechnic Institute in Kyiv in 1930, then he entered postgraduate school.
In 1931 he was appointed the Head engineer of the Kyiv factory "Krasny Humovyk"  and in 1932 he worked as Director of "Ukrkabel" plant. In 1938 Ivan Senin was appointed Deputy People's Commissar of USSR consumer industry, and in a year he became People's Commissar.

World War II
In 1940-1942 Ivan Senin was appointed the Deputy Chairman of People's Commissars of USSR. 
In 1941, during World War II he led the command group of the Southwestern Front, starting from December 1942 he worked in the Central Committee. In 1943 he's back for the position of Deputy Chairman of People's Commissars, in 1943-1953 he worked in the position of the Deputy Head of Council of Ministers.

Political activities 
In 1949–1965 years he was the member of the Politburo, later - member of Presidium of the Central Committee of Ukrainian TsK VKP(b), in 1956–1961 years - candidate member to the Communist Party Central Committee, in 1961–1966 years - member of the Communist Party Central Committee, Deputy of Supreme Soviet of Ukrainian SSR (1947–1967) and of Supreme Soviet of the Soviet Union (1946–1966). In the period of 1953-1965 Ivan Senin was appointed the First Deputy Head of Government (in 1957-1959 - the Head of Gosplan of USSR).

As a member of USSR delegation, in 1945 Ivan Senin participated in the UN conference in San Francisco, in 1947 in Paris on behalf of USSR Government he signed peace treaties with Italy, Finland, Bulgaria, Romania and Hungary.

Ivan Senin died in 1981. He was buried in Kyiv, at Baikove Cemetery.

Awards 
 Order of Lenin (4 times)
 Order of the Red Banner of Labour

References 

The information in this article is based on that in its Ukrainian equivalent.

External links 
 Ivan Senin short bio at Electronic Library - Books and People
 Reference guide on the History of the Communist Party and the Soviet Union 1898 - 1991

1903 births
1981 deaths
Politicians from Donetsk
People from Yekaterinoslav Governorate
Central Committee of the Communist Party of the Soviet Union members
Communist Party of the Soviet Union members
Politicians of the Ukrainian Soviet Socialist Republic
Directors of the State Planning Committee of the Ukrainian Soviet Socialist Republic
First deputy chairpersons of the Council of Ministers of Ukraine
Recipients of the Order of Lenin
Second convocation members of the Verkhovna Rada of the Ukrainian Soviet Socialist Republic
20th-century Ukrainian politicians
Third convocation members of the Verkhovna Rada of the Ukrainian Soviet Socialist Republic
Fourth convocation members of the Verkhovna Rada of the Ukrainian Soviet Socialist Republic
Fifth convocation members of the Verkhovna Rada of the Ukrainian Soviet Socialist Republic
Sixth convocation members of the Verkhovna Rada of the Ukrainian Soviet Socialist Republic
Date of death missing